Ghasem Dehnavi (born March 21, 1981 in Mashhad, Iran) is a retired Iranian football player. He usually played as a defensive midfielder.

Club career
Dehnavi joined Mes Kerman in 2009 from Mes Rafsanjan. After spending three seasons at Mes, he moved to Tractor Sazi. He signed a two-years contract with Persepolis on 3 July 2013 and is used as a defensive midfielder. In June 2014, after only one season with Persepolis in which he made only fifteen league appearances, Dehnavi signed with Zob Ahan. On 23 July 2015, he joined Saba Qom on a one-year contract.

Club career statistics

 Assist Goals

International career
He made his debut against Mauritania in April 2012 under Carlos Queiroz.

International goals

Scores and results list Iran's goal tally first.

Honours

Club
Zob Ahan
Hazfi Cup (1): 2014–15

References

External links 
Ghasem Dehnavi at PersianLeague.com
Ghasem Dehnavi at ffiri.ir

1981 births
Living people
Iranian footballers
Persian Gulf Pro League players
Azadegan League players
Mes Rafsanjan players
Sanat Mes Kerman F.C. players
Bargh Shiraz players
Tractor S.C. players
Sportspeople from Mashhad
Iran international footballers
Association football midfielders
21st-century Iranian people